Shevchenko Park may refer to several city parks in Ukraine, named after Taras Shevchenko:

 Svevchenko Park, in Nizhyn, Chernihiv Oblast
 Taras Shevchenko Park, in Dnipro, Dnipropetrovsk Oblast; see FC Dynamo Dnipropetrovsk
 Shevchenko Park, in Pereshchepyne, Dnipropetrovsk Oblast 
 Shevchenko Park, in Ivano-Frankivsk
 Shevchenko Park, in Kharkiv
 Taras Shevchenko Park, on Volodymyrska Street in Kyiv
 Shevchenko Park (Odesa)
 Shevchenko Park, in Rivne
 Shevchenko Park, in Ternopil